The Earth Summit is a major United Nations conference held in Rio de Janeiro from June 3 to June 14, 1992.

Earth Summit may also refer to:

 Earth Summit (horse), a National Hunt racehorse
 Earth Summit 2002, a United Nations conference held in Johannesburg, South Africa